Nelson H. Davis (September 20, 1821 – May 15, 1890) was a general in the United States Army; serving in the Mexican–American War, the American Civil War and in actions against the Apache people in New Mexico.

Davis graduated from the United States Military Academy at West Point in 1846 and served as an infantry officer in the Mexican-American War. When the civil war began then-Captain Davis fought at the First Battle of Manassas. He became colonel of the 7th Massachusetts Infantry Regiment but after a few months he was transferred as a major to a staff position within the Army of the Potomac. In this capacity, he caught the attention of Maj. Gen. George B. McClellan, who eventually assigned Davis to duty with his headquarters staff. On July 10, 1868, President Andrew Johnson nominated Davis for the award of the honorary grade of brevet brigadier general in the Regular Army, to rank from March 13, 1865, for meritorious and efficient services during the war. The U.S. Senate confirmed the brevet on July 28, 1868.

After the war Davis continued his military service and eventually became Inspector General of the U.S. Army in 1885. He retired in the same year with the rank of brigadier general. He died at Governor's Island, New York, on May 15, 1890.

See also

 List of American Civil War brevet generals (Union)
 Massachusetts in the American Civil War

Notes

References

 
 
 Hunt, Roger D. and Brown, Jack R. Brevet Brigadier Generals in Blue. Gaithersburg, MD: Olde Soldier Books, Inc., 1990. .

Union Army colonels
People of Massachusetts in the American Civil War
1821 births
1890 deaths
People from Oxford, Massachusetts
American military personnel of the Mexican–American War
United States Military Academy alumni
Inspectors General of the United States Army
United States Army generals